Chisht Nagar (Punjabi/Urdu: چشت نگر) is a town of Changa Manga. 

Sufi shrines in Pakistan
History of Multan
Buildings and structures in Multan
Chishti Order
Punjabi Sufi saints